Herbert Stuart Pakington, 4th Baron Hampton (15 May 1883 – 30 October 1962), served as Chief Commissioner of The Scout Association.

He was educated at Wellington College, Berkshire, and the Royal Military College, Sandhurst. He became the 4th Baron Hampton in 1906. He was a 1931 recipient of the Silver Buffalo Award.

Pakington's sister Mary Augusta Pakington was an English dramatist.

Published works

See also 
 Baron Hampton
 Pakington baronets
 Pakington family

References

1883 births
1962 deaths
People educated at Wellington College, Berkshire
Chief Commissioners of The Scout Association
4
Younger sons of barons